Kristopher Kyer, or Kristopher Antekeyer; (born in Muskegon, Michigan, USA) is an actor, dialogue coach and acting coach. His career spans more than three decades as an actor, performer, teacher, singer and director in the entertainment industry. For almost two decades in Burbank, he was the director and owner of the Kyer Workshop for Actors. As an actor, Kyer appeared in several commercials, especially as a  scarecrow  for advertising White Lily cornmeal, which ran for many years.

Filmography

References

External links 
 
 

Living people
Male actors from Michigan
People from Muskegon, Michigan
American male film actors
American male television actors
American male voice actors
1958 births